{{DISPLAYTITLE:C17H19NO}}
The molecular formula C17H19NO (molar mass: 253.34 g/mol, exact mass: 253.1467 u) may refer to:

 Benzedrone
 3-Benzhydrylmorpholine
 Diphenylprolinol
 Nefopam

Molecular formulas